The Aluminij Gallery (Croatian: Galerija Aluminij) is an art gallery located in Mostar, Bosnia and Herzegovina. It is sponsored and run by one of the largest companies in the area, Aluminij.

The gallery most commonly hosts exhibitions of sculpture and painting, and graphic art. Artists who have exhibited in the gallery include an academician Miroslav Šutej, an academic graphic artist and sculptor Stipe Sikirica, the painters Zlatko Prica, Vasko Lipovac, Matko Trebotić, Dubravka Babić, Munir Vejzović, Vasilije Josip Jordan, Vatroslav Kuliš, Ivan Kožarić, Želimir Ivanović, Josip Diminić, Josip Botteri Dini, and Nikola Reiser. A certain number of art works was purchased by the Aluminij Gallery after each exhibition and its fundus also includes a permanent art collection. 

The Gallery Aluminij carefully nurtures an exhibitor-museum activity by promoting academic visual arts, and in its Salon 1 hosts respectable artistic names, while at the Salon 2 enables the presentation of the artists on the rise, while maintaining the academic level. 

The only exceptions are made in organizing joint humanitarian and historical–documentary exhibitions. Except for its primary intention - the cultivation and promotion of artistic creativity – the Gallery is a pleasant place for presentations of literary achievements, chamber concerts and similar events. The Gallery is open every working day from 7 am to 8 pm, and on Saturdays from 9 am to 2 pm. The admission has always been free.

References

Art museums and galleries in Bosnia and Herzegovina
Museums in Mostar
Contemporary art galleries in Europe
Year of establishment missing